"I'm Up" is a song by American recording artist Omarion, originally intended as the lead single for his upcoming sixth studio album Passport (2020). The track features verses by American rappers French Montana and Kid Ink. Production is handled by American record producer Nic Nac.

Background
The song premiered on the radio station Power 106 June 16, 2015, and was released for digital download on June 18. The song was produced by Nic Nac who previously also produced "Loyal" and "Ayo" by Chris Brown and Tyga.

Music video
The official music video premiered August 27, 2015 on Vevo.

Critical reception
Upon release, "I'm Up" was well received by music critics. Rap-Up called the guest appearances of Ink and Montana "playful". Music Times called the song "new summer anthem", also adding that "Montana comes through with auto-tune and Ink spits some catchy bars". Candice Jones of Essence also gave a positive review to the song, writing, "It's a summer jam that is sure to have you dancing in your car or at your desk." Peneliope Richards of Respect. stated that the song is not far away from being a summer hit, since the production is reminiscent of Chris Brown’s "Loyal".

Charts

References

External links
 

2015 singles
2015 songs
French Montana songs
Kid Ink songs
Omarion songs
Maybach Music Group singles
Atlantic Records singles
Songs written by French Montana
Songs written by Nic Nac
Songs written by Kid Ink
Songs written by Omarion